Specklinia is a genus of orchids native to South America, Central America, and the Caribbean. It contains approximately 100 species.

Species
, Kew's Plants of the World Online listed 105 species:

References

 
Pleurothallidinae genera